The table below is a medal classified table of every motorcycle speedway rider to have finished in the top three of a European Pairs Speedway Championship competition, between 2004 and 2014. In total, 61 different riders from 9 national teams have a European Pairs Championship medal(s). Aleš Dryml, Jr. and Lukáš Dryml hold the record with six medals (four gold and two silver) each.

Classification

See also 
 Speedway World Championship Classification
 Speedway World Cup Classification

!